"Music Box Dancer" is an instrumental piece by Canadian musician Frank Mills that was an international hit in the late 1970s. It features an arpeggiated piano theme in C-sharp major (enharmonic to D-flat major) designed to resemble a music box, accompanied by other instruments playing a counterpoint melody as well as a wordless chorus. (Most modern piano music sheets have the song in the key of C major.)

Mills wrote and recorded "Music Box Dancer" in 1974, but it did not become a single until December 1978. By Christmas of that year, it was in the top ten of many European and Asian pop music charts. Released as a single in the United States in January 1979, it reached #3 on the Billboard Hot 100 chart on the week ending May 5, and also reached #3 on the Canadian Adult Contemporary chart and #47 on the Canadian pop chart. The single also did well in Australia, reaching #14 on the Australian Singles Chart (Kent Music Report).

A few notes are missing in the third repeated introduction to the main melody, which could not be corrected, as Mills did not have the funds to record another take.

History 
In 1974, Mills released an album that featured "Music Box Dancer", but it was not initially a hit. When he re-signed with Polydor Records Canada in 1978, the label released a new song as a single, with "Music Box Dancer" on the B-side. The single was sent to easy-listening stations in Canada, and one copy was mistakenly sent to CFRA, an Ottawa pop station. The program director played the A-side and could not figure out why it had been sent to his station, so he played the B-side to see if the record label had been mistakenly marked. He liked "Music Box Dancer" and added it to his station's playlist.

The song's success at CFRA was swift. "Music Box Dancer" premiered on CFRA's top 30 chart on May 5, 1978; by June 30, it was the #1 song on the station's playlist. "Music Box Dancer" also began picking up play on other Canadian stations around this time, becoming a nationwide hit. Mills's album went gold in Canada, which, after several months, prompted Polydor in the US to release the album and single with the B-side "The Poet and I".

The million-selling Gold-certified single reached #3 on the Billboard Hot 100 in the spring of 1979 as well as #4 on the Billboard Easy Listening chart, while the album reached #21 on the Billboard Top Album chart and also went gold. Around that time, Nashville, Tennessee television station WNGE used Music Box Dancer as its news theme; it became so popular among Middle Tennessee viewers that Polydor awarded a gold record to WNGE for breaking the single in the U.S.

It was Mills's only U.S. Top 40 pop hit; the follow-up, another piano instrumental titled "Peter Piper", peaked at #48 on the Billboard Hot 100, although it was a popular Top 10 hit on the Billboard Adult Contemporary chart. Mills managed one final Adult Contemporary chart entry, "Happy Song", which peaked at #41 at the beginning of 1981.

Mills also released a version of Ricky Nelson's "Poor Little Fool" with substantial airplay in Ontario during the 1970s and 1980s.

Chart performance

Weekly singles charts

Year-end charts

Cover versions 
"Music Box Dancer" has been recorded by such pianists as Floyd Cramer, Richard Clayderman, Roger Williams and Eric Robertson, and by orchestral artists such as James Last and 101 Strings. Bandleader Ray Conniff added lyrics and titled the song on his album I Will Survive in 1979. Germany's Roberto Delgado recorded a calypso version, and an accordion version was released in Sweden. The band PePe produced a techno version. It was also recorded by Enormous Richard for the Pravda Records compilation 20 More Explosive Fantastic Rockin' Mega Smash Hit Explosions!. German singer Marion Maerz made a German vocal version of the song, and The Wiggles covered it on the video/album Racing to the Rainbow. In 1980, famous Hong Kong songstress Paula Tsui (Xu Xiaofeng) released a version of this song with the same melody and added Cantonese lyrics inspired by Frank Mills' Official music video, it was arranged by Paulino Chris Babida and with lyrics by Cheng Kwok Kong (Zheng Guojiang).
The Ventures released a guitar-led cover version in their 1981 album Pops in Japan '81.
A cover version by session musicians was also used by the BBC in one of its trade-test transmission tapes in the late 1970s, most often accompanied by Test Card F in vision. The song is also often played by ice cream trucks in the U.S.

In popular culture
 The tune was used as the theme music for BBC Radio 2's coverage of the 1978 Commonwealth Games. Presenter Terry Wogan referred to the tune as the 'demented pianist'.
 The tune was used for KCBS's half-hour series 2 on the Town from 1979 till the early 1980s.
 The tune is playing on the ice cream van heard in the background during part 1 of Kill Bill.
 A segment of the song was used in The Simpsons episode "Bart Star", in a flashback to Homer's time as a high-school gymnast.
 The song is part of the movie Summerhood's soundtrack.
 A snippet of the song is played on piano by Dewey in the Malcolm in the Middle episode "Reese Joins the Army".
 The song is played during a hotel dinner scene in AMC's Halt and Catch Fire, season 1, episode 7 ("Giant").
 It was the theme of the late 1970s BBC pro-celebrity golf series "Around With Alliss" (fronted by professional golfer Peter Alliss).
 A version of the song is played over the closing credits of the 1998 Danish movie Festen (The Celebration).
A snip of the tune can be seen playing on episode "Goodbye Mr. Bear" on Full House.
 Peter Griffin played the tune in a Westworld-esque saloon in the episode "Meg's Wedding" of Family Guy.
 The tune was played over the PA system of Myer Southland, Victoria, Australia at close of business each trading day.
Part of the tune is played at the end of Act 1 from British TV sitcom Canned Laughter (1979), written and performed by Rowan Atkinson.
 In 2022, the song was played during Fox's pregame coverage of Game 5 of the National League Championship Series.

References

1974 songs
1978 singles
1970s instrumentals
Number-one singles in Switzerland
Frank Mills songs
Polydor Records singles
Pop instrumentals
Songs about music